Bharat Boghara is Indian politician from the Bharatiya Janata Party. He was a Member of Legislative assembly from Jasdan constituency in Gujarat for its 12th legislative assembly. He is Vice President of BJP Gujarat state and former chairman of Sardar Patel Jalsanchay Nigam in Gujarat Government. He is director of Dhruv Cotton Processing Private Limited and MM Yarns Private Limited Jasdan. He is also chairman of All Gujarat Spinning Mill Association.

References

Gujarat MLAs 2007–2012
Living people
Bharatiya Janata Party politicians from Gujarat
Year of birth missing (living people)